Isobel Dorothy Powley (born 7 March 1992) is an English actress. Powley was born and raised in London, where she was educated at Holland Park School. She began acting as a teenager on television, starring on the CBBC action television series M.I. High (2007–2008), the period miniseries Little Dorrit (2008), the crime series Murderland (2009),  and the ITV sitcom Benidorm (2014).

Powley gained critical praise for her portrayal of Princess Margaret in A Royal Night Out (2015), for which she was nominated for a British Independent Film Award for Most Promising Newcomer, and a sexually confused teenager in the coming-of-age film The Diary of a Teenage Girl, for which she won the Gotham Independent Film Award for Best Actress and the Trophee Chopard at the 2016 Cannes Film Festival. She has since starred in the films Mary Shelley (2017), White Boy Rick (2018),  Ashes in the Snow (2018), and The King of Staten Island (2020) and on the Apple TV+ drama series The Morning Show (2019–2021).

Early life 
Powley was born in the Hammersmith borough of London, England, to British actor Mark Powley and casting director Janis Jaffa. Her mother is Jewish, the descendant of emigrants from Russia to Dublin, Ireland. Powley attended Holland Park School.

Career

Screen
From 2007 until 2008, Powley was one of the lead characters in M.I. High, starring in 23 episodes. Powley has also appeared in several other productions such as Murderland (three episodes, 2009), Little Dorrit (2008), The Bill (2008) and The Whistleblowers (2007). In 2013, Powley was joining the cast of the ITV series Benidorm for series six.

In 2015, Powley portrayed Princess Margaret in the biographical comedy-drama A Royal Night Out, alongside Sarah Gadon as Princess Elizabeth. Powley played the lead role of Minnie Goetze in the comedy-drama film The Diary of a Teenage Girl, which premiered in New York City and Los Angeles in August 2015. Shortly afterward, Powley starred as the titular character in the 2016 indie film Carrie Pilby, taking over the role from Hailee Steinfeld.

In 2018, Powley starred opposite Liv Tyler in the horror film Wildling, and appeared in the crime-drama film White Boy Rick. That same year, Powley played a lead role as Holly Morten in the BBC One drama Informer. In June 2020, Powley appeared in The King of Staten Island as the love interest of Pete Davidson's character.

In 2022, Powley played Birdy, one of the main characters in the TV series Everything I Know About Love.

Stage
Powley appeared as Maggie in Tusk Tusk at the Royal Court Theatre, London, in March 2009. On Broadway, she was Thomasina in the 2011 revival of Arcadia at the Ethel Barrymore Theatre. In October 2011, she once again appeared at the Royal Court as Tilly in Jumpy, a role to which she returned in the West End transfer of Jumpy to the Duke of York's Theatre in August 2012. She appeared as Dawn in the March 2018 revival of Lobby Hero at the Hayes Theatre, alongside Chris Evans, Michael Cera and Bryan Tyree Henry.

Personal life
In an interview in 2013, Powley said she had a spot reserved to study history at the University of Manchester, but she never attended.  It was announced in July 2021 via actor Douglas Booth's Instagram page that he and Powley are engaged to be married after meeting on the set of the film Mary Shelley in 2016.

Filmography

Film

Television

Theatre

Awards and nominations

References

External links

1992 births
21st-century English actresses
Actresses from London
English child actresses
English people of Irish-Jewish descent
English people of Russian-Jewish descent
English film actresses
English television actresses
Jewish English actresses
Living people
People educated at Holland Park School
People from Hammersmith
People from Shepherd's Bush
21st-century English women
21st-century English people
Chopard Trophy for Female Revelation winners